Cuatro (meaning "four" in Spanish) is the fourth studio album by American heavy metal band Flotsam and Jetsam, released on October 13, 1992 via MCA Records. This was the band's first album with bassist Jason Ward, who had replaced Troy Gregory the year before.

While Cuatro continued the experimentation with a progressive/technical sound that began on Flotsam and Jetsam's previous album, When the Storm Comes Down, it saw them move away from thrash metal to a rather slower, slightly more melodic approach. Similar to its predecessor, Cuatros lyrical themes are more about politics and society as opposed to the occult and evil themes that were used on the band's first two albums, Doomsday for the Deceiver and No Place for Disgrace.

The album was re-released on May 13, 2008 by Metal Mind Productions, remastered with five bonus tracks and limited to 2,000 copies. The re-release also contains new packaging and liner notes from band members Eric A.K., Jason Ward and Ed Carlson.

Chris Cornell of Soundgarden co-wrote "The Message" and is credited as Christopher Cornell.

Track listing
All songs written by Edward Carlson, Eric A. Knutson, Jason Ward, Kelly Smith, Michael Gilbert and Eric Braverman, except where noted.

Personnel 
Credits are adapted from the liner notes.
Eric A.K. – lead, background vocals
Edward Carlson – guitars, background vocals
Michael Gilbert – guitars, background vocals
Jason B. Ward – bass, background vocals
Kelly David-Smith – drums, background vocals

Other 
Orchestration on "Forget About Heaven" by Michael Gilbert; performed by Neil Kernon

Production 
Produced by Neil Kernon
Eric Braverman – co-producer, production co-ordinator and the sixth Flotsam
mixed at Pakaderm Studios, Los Alamitos, California
recorded, engineered and mixed by Neil Kernon. Assistant engineers: Michelle Schindler, A.J. Justico
Doug Beiden, J.R. McNeely – mixing assistants
Howie Weinberg – mastering

References

1992 albums
Flotsam and Jetsam (band) albums
Albums produced by Neil Kernon